The year 1873 in architecture involved some significant architectural events and new buildings.

Events
 May 1–October 31 – 1873 Vienna World's Fair (Weltausstellung 1873 Wien) is staged with the Rotunde as centrepiece. Architect for the exposition is Karl von Hasenauer, who is created Freiherr for his services; engineer for the Rotunda roof is John Scott Russell.

Buildings and structures

Buildings opened

 May 5 – Midland Grand Hotel in London, England, is substantially completed and opened, the largest hotel in the world at this time.
 August 22 – Garrett Theatre, Póvoa de Varzim, Portugal.
 September 2 – The Berlin Victory Column in Berlin, Germany.
 September 29 – Christ Church Cathedral, Ottawa, Canada.

Buildings completed
 Ørskog Church, Norway, by Jacob Wilhelm Nordan.
 Rua Augusta Arch in Lisbon, built to commemorate the city's reconstruction after the 1755 earthquake.
 Trinity Church, Copley Square, Boston, Massachusetts, USA, designed by H. H. Richardson.
 Rood Building, Grand Rapids, Michigan.
 549 Lordship Lane: the "Concrete House", East Dulwich, London.
 Buckley Arms hotel, Dinas Mawddwy, Wales, built in reinforced concrete.

Awards
 RIBA Royal Gold Medal – Thomas Henry Wyatt
 Grand Prix de Rome, architecture: Marcel Lambert

Births
 February 2 – Oskar Kaufmann, Hungarian-Jewish architect (died 1956)
 August 20 – Eliel Saarinen, Finnish art deco architect (died 1950)
 November 10 – David Lynn, US architect, Architect of the Capitol 1923–1954 (died 1961)
 date unknown – Salvador Valeri i Pupurull, Catalan architect (died 1954)

Deaths
 May 2 – Samuel Sanders Teulon, English Gothic Revival architect (born 1812)
 date unknown – Sampson Kempthorne, English architect and workhouse designer also practising in New Zealand (born 1809)

References

Architecture
Years in architecture
19th-century architecture